Ancilla matthewsi is a species of sea snail, a marine gastropod mollusk in the family Ancillariidae.

References

matthewsi
Gastropods described in 1967